Pershore is a market town and civil parish in the Wychavon district in Worcestershire, England, on the banks of the River Avon. At the 2011 census, the population was 7,125. The town is best known for Pershore Abbey.

History

The town contains examples of Georgian architecture. In 1964 the Council for British Archaeology included Pershore in its list of 51 British "Gem Towns" worthy of special consideration for historic preservation, and it has been listed as an outstanding conservation area. Parts of the abbey, which stand in an expanse of public grassland close to the centre of the town, date from the 11th century. The current structure is far smaller than the original building, which was plundered during the reign of Henry VIII at the Dissolution. The original nave was destroyed. The north transept collapsed later. The present nave occupies the western part of what would originally have been the choir.

Education
Schools in Pershore follow the three-tier first school (ages 5–9), middle school (ages 9–12), high school (ages 12–18) system practised by parts of Worcestershire County Council. Pershore High School has a sixth form with all-weather sports pitches and sports hall.

Abbey Park First School and Abbey Park Middle School are on Abbey Road, they are both situated down the same drive. Pershore High School is on Station Road, which is on the outskirts of Pershore, bordering Pinvin, a small village.

Holy Redeemer Roman Catholic Primary School, situated on Priest Lane beside Holy Redeemer, Pershore's only Catholic church, stands outside the 3-tier model. It is a primary school (ages 5–11) which acts as a feeder school to Blessed Edward Oldcorne Catholic College in Worcester.

Pershore College, a school of horticulture and other land-based activities, became a campus for Warwickshire College (now WCG) following a merger in 2007.

Annual events

Plum Festival
The Pershore Plum Festival is held in August to celebrate the local tradition of growing plums including the local varieties Pershore Purple, Pershore Yellow Egg Plum and Pershore Emblem. Activities include crowning the plum princess, a family fun run, plum themed art exhibition and the Plum Fayre. There is also a classic car rally and nearby Worcester Racecourse revived The Land O'Plums Chase from 72 years ago. The festival won the Best Tourism Event and Festival in the Worcestershire Welcome Awards 2011.

Sport
Pershore Bowling Club is situated within Abbey Park; formed in 1928 following an invitation by the then Lord Abbott of Pershore to the tradesmen of the town to play bowls on the lawn at the monastery, long since demolished. The Lord Abbott accepted an invitation to
be the Club’s first President and continued to hold this office until 1936 when the monastery was closed and the monks moved to Nashdom Abbey in Buckinghamshire.

Pershore's football club, Pershore Town F.C., play in the West Midlands (Regional) League Premier Division. It also has a women's team, Pershore Town Ladies, who play in the new Herefordshire and Worcestershire Women's County Football League.

Pershore Sports club, which houses Pershore Cricket Club who play in the Birmingham and District League, is situated at The Bottoms on Defford Road.

Pershore Rugby Club has a clubhouse and pitches by the river in nearby Wyre Piddle.

Pershore Tennis Club, based at the Horticultural College, has three indoor and five outdoor courts, with junior, social and adult sections.

Multiple BTCC title winning team, Team Dynamics, is also based there. Wychavon Kayak & Canoe Club  is situated on the river at Pershore Riverside Centre. Pershore Plum Plodders is an England Athletics affiliated running club serving Pershore and the surrounding villages. The Abbey Park includes a bowls club, children's play area and skateboard park (2006), consisting of a mini ramp and a street section.

Transport

The town lies near the A44, approximately midway between Worcester and Evesham. The nearest motorways are the M5 and M50.

Pershore railway station is located in the village of Pinvin. It lies on the Cotswold Line which enables travel to London Paddington, Oxford and Reading.

Pershore Old Bridge

About  outside the town is Pershore Old Bridge over the River Avon. A bridge was originally built on the site, in about 1413, by monks, supposedly after their abbot, Upton, was drowned falling from stepping-stones. The scene is included in the historical window installed in 1862–64 in Pershore Abbey.

In 1644, during the English Civil War, a later bridge was damaged and almost destroyed. In subsequent years the bridge was maintained by re-using stones from nearby Elmley Castle and from the abbey. In 1926 the bridge was taken out of service for road traffic and is now used only as a footbridge.

Notable people
See also 
Natives
 Hugh Bennett (1862–1943), cricketer.
 Claude Choules (1901–2011), was the world's last living veteran of both world wars and supercentenarian.
 Giles Collier (1622–1678), Anglican divine.
 George Dowty (1901–1975), inventor and businessman.
 Florence Feek (1876-1940) Suffragette
 George Mason I (1629–1686), progenitor of the politically significant Mason family in America.

Residents
 Nigel Clark, singer with pop band Dodgy
 Michael Collie (1966–present), TV presenter, BBC Midlands Today.
 Kay Kinsman, (1909-1998), visual artist and mature student at Bishop's University, Lennoxville, Quebec
 Maurice McCanlis (1906–1991), sportsman.
 Charles Shadwell (1898–1979), musician.
 Toyah Willcox, actor and singer, and her husband Robert Fripp of rock band King Crimson.

Climate

Like much of the British Isles, Pershore has a temperate maritime climate. On 31 March 2021 Pershore recorded its warmest March day on record, beating the previous record set the day before. On 7 September 2021, Pershore recorded its hottest September day on record, beating the previous record set in 2005 

This is also the lowest maximum temperature on record for December in England.

References

External links

Pershore Tourist Information

 
Towns in Worcestershire
Market towns in Worcestershire
Civil parishes in Worcestershire
Wychavon
Cotswolds